Banff and Buchan is a committee area of the Aberdeenshire Council, Scotland.
It has a population of 35,742 (2001 Census). Fishing and agriculture are important industries, together with associated processing and service activity.

Banff and Buchan was also the name of a district of Grampian Region between 1975 and 1996.  The district covered a much larger area than the committee area, and included what are now the committee areas of Buchan, which, despite its name, is not part of the committee area of Banff and Buchan, and Formartine.

Banff and Buchan committee area 
The area is relatively self-contained, and in recent years has seen a small decline in population. It does, however, have tourism assets in its coastline, coastal villages and visitor attractions. Economic dependency, peripherality, and the future of the Common Fisheries/Agricultural Policies, are key issues. The Buchan Local Action Plan will address some of these concerns. The Area qualifies for European Union Objective 2 structural funding.

This region manifests prehistory  by the ancient monument at Longman Hill, a large long barrow somewhat to the southeast of Macduff, as well as Cairn Lee somewhat to the west of Longman Hill.

Banff and Buchan district

Banff and Buchan was formerly a local government district in the Grampian region, created in 1975, under the Local Government (Scotland) Act 1973. It combined, from Banffshire, the burghs of Banff, Aberchirder, Macduff and Portsoy; the districts of Aberchirder and Banff; and the electoral division of Fordyce. From Aberdeenshire, came the burghs of Fraserburgh, Peterhead, Rosehearty and Turriff; the districts of Deer and Turriff; and the electoral division of Cruden. (The rest of the county of Banff became part of the Moray district of the region.)

In 1996, the Banff and Buchan district was merged into a new Aberdeenshire unitary council area, under the Local Government etc (Scotland) Act 1994.  The former district was divided between the three committee areas of Banff and Buchan, Buchan (the area around Peterhead) and Formartine (the area around Ellon and Turriff).

Parliamentary constituencies

The name is also used for the Banff and Buchan constituency of the House of Commons of the Parliament of the United Kingdom (at Westminster). This seat has been held since 2017 by David Duiguid of the Conservative Party who gained it from Dr Eilidh Whiteford of the Scottish National Party. From 1999 to 2011 Banff and Buchan was also used as a constituency of the Scottish Parliament (at Holyrood). Despite sharing the same name, the boundaries of the two constituencies differed after 2005.

See also
Subdivisions of Scotland

References
Specific

General

 
Politics of Aberdeenshire